The 2016 Idol Star Athletics Rhythmic Gymnastics Futsal Archery Championships was held at Goyang Gymnasium in Goyang, South Korea on August 29 and was broadcast on MBC on September 15, 2016 at 17:15 (KST) for two episodes.

Synopsis
The episode features male and female K-pop entertainers, which competes in various sports competitions. At the championships, a total number of 8 events (4 in athletics, 2 in archery, 1 in rhythmic gymnastics and 1 in futsal) were contested: 4 by men and 4 by women. There were around 200 K-pop singers and celebrities who participated, divided into 7 teams.

Cast

Main 
 Team A: Twice, Got7, Block B
 Team B: EXID, BTS, Hur Young-ji, Melody Day, Snuper
 Team C: Monsta X, VIXX, Chanmi (AOA), GFriend
 Team D: B1A4, Hello Venus, Beatwin, Lovelyz, Astro
 Team E: Apink, BtoB, Fiestar, Madtown, KNK
 Team F: Oh My Girl, Up10tion, MAP6, Cosmic Girls
 Team G: Mamamoo, Sonamoo, U-KISS, B.A.P, Brave Girls

Results

Men

Athletics

Archery

Futsal

Women

Athletics

Rhythmic gymnastics

Archery

Ratings

References

External links
 2016 Idol Star Athletics Rhythmic Gymnastics Futsal Archery Championships

MBC TV original programming
South Korean variety television shows
South Korean game shows
2016 in South Korean television
Idol Star Athletics Championships